The 1951 VFL Lightning Premiership was an Australian rules football knockout competition played entirely on Wednesday, 9 May. It was played on the Jubilee Day holiday, held to celebrate 50 years of Federation of Australia, between rounds 3 and 4 of the Victorian Football League's 1951 season with all games played at the MCG. This was the fourth time a lightning premiership had been contested in the VFL, the first since 1943. It was contested by the 12 VFL teams who competed in the 1951 VFL season. A total of 25,882 people attended the competition. Collingwood won its second Lighting Premiership competition defeating Melbourne in the final by 6 points.

Matches

First round

|- bgcolor="#CCCCFF"
| Home team
| Home team score
| Away team
| Away team score
| Ground
| Date
|- bgcolor="#FFFFFF"
| Carlton
| 2.2 (14)
| Footscray
| 3.2 (20)
| MCG
| Wednesday, 9 May
|- bgcolor="#FFFFFF"
| Hawthorn
| 0.1 (1)
| Melbourne
| 0.4 (4)
| MCG
| Wednesday, 9 May
|- bgcolor="#FFFFFF"
| Essendon
| 1.5 (11)
| Fitzroy
| 0.2 (2)
| MCG
| Wednesday, 9 May
|- bgcolor="#FFFFFF"
| Geelong
| 3.3 (21)
| St Kilda
| 2.2 (14)
| MCG
| Wednesday, 9 May
|- bgcolor="#CCCCFF"
|colspan=6 align="center"|Bye: Richmond, Collingwood, North Melbourne, South Melbourne

Second round

|- bgcolor="#CCCCFF"
| Home team
| Home team score
| Away team
| Away team score
| Ground
| Date
|- bgcolor="#FFFFFF"
| Richmond
| 4.2 (26)
| South Melbourne
| 2.3 (15)
| MCG
| Wednesday, 9 May
|- bgcolor="#FFFFFF"
| Collingwood
| 2.1 (13)
| North Melbourne
| 0.3 (3)
| MCG
| Wednesday, 9 May
|- bgcolor="#FFFFFF"
| Footscray
| 0.0 (0)
| Melbourne
| 1.2 (8)
| MCG
| Wednesday, 9 May
|- bgcolor="#FFFFFF"
| Essendon
| 4.3 (27)
| Geelong
| 2.1 (13)
| MCG
| Wednesday, 9 May

Semi finals

|- bgcolor="#CCCCFF"
| Home team
| Home team score
| Away team
| Away team score
| Ground
| Date
|- bgcolor="#FFFFFF"
| Richmond
| 2.2 (14)
| Melbourne
| 3.2 (20)
| MCG
| Wednesday, 9 May
|- bgcolor="#FFFFFF"
| Collingwood
| 2.2 (14)
| Essendon
| 2.1 (13)
| MCG
| Wednesday, 9 May

Grand final

|- bgcolor="#CCCCFF"
| Home team
| Home team score
| Away team
| Away team score
| Ground
| Date
|- bgcolor="#FFFFFF"
| Melbourne
| 1.0 (6)
| Collingwood
| 2.0 (12)
| MCG
| Wednesday, 9 May

See also
List of Australian Football League night premiers
Australian Football League pre-season competition
1951 VFL season

References

Australian Football League pre-season competition
Vfl Lightning Premiership, 1951